Peroxiredoxin like 2B is a protein that in humans is encoded by the PRXL2B gene.

References